Gavin Carlin (born 6 February 1985 from Derry) is a professional Northern Irish darts player who currently playing in the Professional Darts Corporation events.

He attended UK Q-School in 2019, where he won a two-year Tour Card after finishing 4th on the Order of Merit rankings.

Career 
Carlin made his TV major debut at the 2019 UK Open by beating John Michael, Glen Durrant and losing to Luke Woodhouse.

Carlin lost his tour card in 2022, He has since played on the Modus Super Series tour & he picked up his first title by winning Week 10 of the 13 week tournament.

References

External links

Living people
Darts players from Northern Ireland
Professional Darts Corporation former tour card holders
1985 births